Smith Brothers Farms is a dairy and home delivery service based in Kent, Washington, United States.

History 
Smith Brothers Farms was established in 1920 by Benjamin Smith who had a couple of Holstein cows that he milked by hand. The dairy now delivers to more than 40,000 homes around the Puget Sound region, including Seattle, Olympia, and Everett.

In 2001, their herd eventually outgrew the pastures in Kent and Snohomish and were moved to Grant County in Eastern Washington. Due to federal regulations in 2006, Smith Brothers Farms sold their cows and farm in Royal City. In August 2013, the dairy moved from their original location of 93 years on West Valley Highway to their current headquarters and milk-processing facility in Kent, Washington. The land was sold to Carpinito Brothers where it has since remained a farm.

Since selling the herd, the milk is sourced from co-ops around Washington state, which is then pasteurized, homogenized, and packed at their plant in Kent. Their 50,000 square foot dairy facility includes equipment that can produce up to 60,000 gallons of milk a day. Before it was a dairy production facility, it was a Heinz frozen soup factory.

In addition to their Kent location, Smith Brothers Farms has distribution depots in Woodinville and Tacoma.

Awards 
Smith Brothers Farms was awarded Plant of the Year in 2014 from Dairy Foods.

References 

Farms in Washington (state)
1920 establishments in Washington (state)
Dairy farming in the United States